Azarsi may refer to:
Azarsi, Bandpey-ye Gharbi
Azarsi, Bandpey-ye Sharqi
Azarsi-ye Babal Konar
Azarsi Hattem
Azarsi-ye Hoseyn Khanzadeh
Azarsi-ye Nematollah
Azarsi-ye Sadollah
Azarsi-ye Taskanu